Trans-Mountain or variation, may refer to:

 Trans Mountain pipeline (TM & TMX; "Trans-Mountain"), a petroleum pipeline in British Columbia, Canada
 Trans Mountain Corporation, the crown corporation operating company for the Trans Mountain pipeline
 Transmountain Early College High School, El Paso, Texas, USA
 TransMountain Road, El Paso, Texas, USA; see Culture of El Paso

See also

 TransMontaigne, a U.S. pipeline company
 
 
 Mountain (disambiguation)
 Trans (disambiguation)